Augusto Liverani, also known as Agostino Liverani (Senigallia, 7 August 1895 – Dongo, 28 April 1945) was an Italian Fascist politician, Minister of Communications of the Italian Social Republic.

Biography

He participated in the First World War as an officer of the 5th Bersaglieri Regiment, and was wounded in action and mutilated. After joining the National Fascist Party, he served as president of the province of Novara and, during the Second World War, as secretary of the Milan Industry Employees Union. In 1939 he became a member of the Chamber of Fasces and Corporations.

He was married to Brunilla Fusilli and had two children, Riccardo and Elena. Filmmaker Maurizio Liverani, who in the final part of the war fought in the Italian Resistance, was his nephew.

He became Minister of Communications of the Italian Social Republic on 5 October 1943, following the renunciation of Gaetano Polverelli. At the end of the war, on 28 April 1945, he was captured with the Duce by the partisans and shot in Dongo. His body was hung in piazzale Loreto in Milan. He was initially buried in the Cimitero Maggiore of Milan, and later moved to his native Senigallia.

References

1895 births
1945 deaths
People of the Italian Social Republic
Executed politicians
People executed by Italy by firing squad
Executed Italian people